In signal processing, linear phase is a property of a filter where the phase response of the filter is a linear function of frequency. The result is that all frequency components of the input signal are shifted in time (usually delayed) by the same constant amount (the slope of the linear function), which is referred to as the group delay. Consequently, there is no phase distortion due to the time delay of frequencies relative to one another.

For discrete-time signals, perfect linear phase is easily achieved with a finite impulse response (FIR) filter by having coefficients which are symmetric or anti-symmetric. Approximations can be achieved with infinite impulse response (IIR) designs, which are more computationally efficient. Several techniques are:
 a Bessel transfer function which has a maximally flat group delay approximation function
 a phase equalizer

Definition 
A filter is called a linear phase filter if the phase component of the frequency response is a linear function of frequency.  For a continuous-time application, the frequency response of the filter is the Fourier transform of the filter's impulse response, and a linear phase version has the form:

where:
A(ω) is a real-valued function.
 is the group delay.

For a discrete-time application, the discrete-time Fourier transform of the linear phase impulse response has the form:

where:
A(ω) is a real-valued function with 2π periodicity.
k is an integer, and k/2 is the group delay in units of samples.

 is a Fourier series that can also be expressed in terms of the Z-transform of the filter impulse response.  I.e.:

where the  notation distinguishes the Z-transform from the Fourier transform.

Examples 
When a sinusoid  passes through a filter with constant (frequency-independent) group delay   the result is:

where:
 is a frequency-dependent amplitude multiplier.

It follows that a complex exponential function:

is transformed into:

For approximately linear phase, it is sufficient to have that property only in the passband(s) of the filter, where |A(ω)| has relatively large values.  Therefore, both magnitude and phase graphs (Bode plots) are customarily used to examine a filter's linearity.  A "linear" phase graph may contain discontinuities of π and/or 2π radians.  The smaller ones happen where A(ω) changes sign.  Since |A(ω)| cannot be negative, the changes are reflected in the phase plot.  The 2π discontinuities happen because of plotting the principal value of   instead of the actual value.

In discrete-time applications, one only examines the region of frequencies between 0 and the Nyquist frequency, because of periodicity and symmetry.  Depending on the frequency units, the Nyquist frequency may be 0.5, 1.0, π, or ½ of the actual sample-rate.  Some examples of linear and non-linear phase are shown below.

 

A discrete-time filter with linear phase may be achieved by an FIR filter which is either symmetric or anti-symmetric.  A necessary but not sufficient condition is:

Generalized linear phase 

Systems with generalized linear phase have an additional frequency-independent constant  added to the phase.  In the discrete-time case, for example, the frequency response has the form:

 for 

Because of this constant, the phase of the system is not a strictly linear function of frequency, but it retains many of the useful properties of linear phase systems.

See also 
Minimum phase

Notes

Citations

Digital signal processing